Carole Mary Toy (18 July 1948 – 22 November 2014) was an Australian archer.  She competed at two Olympic Games, in 1976 and 1980.

She finished third in the 1979 World Target Championships, held in Berlin.

References

External links
 Carole Toy at the Australian Olympic Committee

1948 births
2014 deaths
Olympic archers of Australia
Archers at the 1976 Summer Olympics
Archers at the 1980 Summer Olympics
Australian female archers
20th-century Australian women
21st-century Australian women